The Swiss 1JJ Tarot deck is a 78-card deck used for the tarot card games Troccas and Troggu and also for divination.

History 
The deck is derived from the Tarot de Besançon, which itself comes from the Tarot of Marseilles. It is an Italian suited pack which substitutes the figures of Juno and Jupiter in place of the Popess and Pope of the Tarot of Marseilles. The first version was produced between 1831 and 1838 in the card factory of Johann Georg Rauch. It was the first tarot pack made by the factory and was unexpectedly successful in the American market. The first version was manufactured, unaltered, by his successor, Johannes Müller in Diessenhofen until 1860. 

In 1965 the Swiss card game firm, AGMüller, issued a reprint which is distinguished by its cleaner lines. The pack owes its name to this edition, the "1" simply being a number within the product line and "JJ" the replacement of 2 trumps by Juno and Jupiter (see below).

Cards 
The face cards are not double headed and both the trumps and pip cards use additive Roman numeral indexing. The lack of modern features like vertically symmetrical face cards, corner indices, and Arabic numerals has made this deck unpopular for tarot players outside of their native communities. For example, the French-speaking Swiss (Romands) prefer using the Tarot Nouveau to play French tarot. It is still the official deck for Troccas tournaments.

Troccas players use the French-language version but refer to their cards with their Romansh (Rhæto-Romanic) nicknames. Troggu players use the German version. The English version uses cartomantic terminology. The names of the trump cards are as follows:

References

External links

Tarot playing card decks
Divination Tarot decks